São Miguel de Mato may refer to the following places in Portugal:

São Miguel do Mato (Arouca), a parish in the municipality of Arouca 
São Miguel do Mato (Vouzela), a parish in the municipality of Vouzela